Michael J. O'Malley, born in (Boston, Massachusetts) is an American Taekwondo athlete and instructor.

O'Malley competed in Taekwondo from 1976 through 1982. He was chosen for the USA Taekwondo teams from 1978 through 1982. He was elected US Team Captain in 1980 and US Team Coach in 1984.

O'Malley was inducted into the Tae Kwon Do Hall of Fame in 2007, and received its Lifetime Achievement Award in 2011.

Jazz musician Ralph Peterson, Jr. is a current student of O'Malley. French-born American Chef Jacky Robert has also studied Taekwondo from O'Malley. American stand-up comedian, actor and writer Joe Rogan and Hong Kong actor and martial artist Donnie Yen both trained with O'Malley in the 1980s and 1990s.

O'Malley founded the M.J. O'Malley Tae Kwon Do Center Website in Peabody, MA in early 2011. The school offers traditional Taekwondo lessons to children and adults.

Achievements and awards

    1976 - First Place, General Choi's (Choi Hong Hi) Cup International Championship
    1976 - Grand Champion, National Open Karate Championships Darien, Connecticut 
    1978 - Gold Medal (Welterweight), U.S. Team Trials, Washington D.C.
    1978 - Member / AAU "All American Men's Tae Kwon Do Team"  
    1978 - U.S. Team Member Pre-World games Seoul, Korea 
    1978 - Bronze Medal, Pan American Games, Mexico City
    1979 - Member / AAU "All American Men's Tae Kwon Do Team"  
    1979 - Grand Champion, "Tiger Kim's" International Open Championship MSG, New York
    1979 - Gold Medal (Welterweight), U.S. Team Trials, Dayton, Ohio
    1979 - Selected "Male Competitor of the Year", U.S. Team Trials.
    1979 - U.S. Team Member, World Taekwondo Championships, Stuttgart Germany
    1979 - Silver Medal, U.S. Team Member, North American Games, Honolulu, Hawaii 
    1979 - U.S. Team Member, World Taekwondo Championships, Taipei, Taiwan 
    1980 - Gold Medal (Welterweight), U.S. Team Trials Berkeley, California
    1980 - Recipient of the "Ken Min Leadership Award" Berkeley, California
    1980 - Elected U.S. Team Captain
    1980 - Gold Medal (Welterweight), U.S. Team Member, Pan American Games Houston, Texas
    1981 - Gold Medal (Welterweight), U.S. Team Member, North America Games Toronto, Canada
    1981 - Gold Medal (Welterweight), U.S. Team Trials Tampa, Florida
    1981 - Elected U.S. Team Captain for World Taekwondo Championships in Ecuador
    1981 - Grand Champion, National Tae Kwon Do Championship Washington D.C.
    1984 - Elected U.S. Team coach of the East Squad for U.S. Olympic Festival Houston, Texas
    1985 - Former Athlete Representative to the United States Olympic Committee
    2007 - Technical Advisor / Taekwondo Hall of Fame Induction
    2009 - Received Taekwondo Lifetime Achievement Award
    2011 - Founded O'Malley Tae Kwon Do Center in Peabody, Massachusetts

External links 
O'Malley Taekwondo Hall of Fame Page
Taekwondo Hall of Fame Archive
M.J. O'Malley Tae Kwon Do Center Website
Clubs registered with USA Taekwondo
Taekwondo Benefits Go Beyond Self Defense
The Christian Science Monitor on Taekwondo: Both Art and Sport
Peabody Patch: MJ O'Malley Tae Kwon Do kicks challenge

1957 births
American male taekwondo practitioners
Living people
20th-century American people